Lewis Tom Cine (born October 5, 1999) is a Haitian-born American football strong safety for the Minnesota Vikings of the National Football League (NFL). He played college football at Georgia and was drafted by the Vikings in the first round of the 2022 NFL Draft.

Early life and high school
Cine was born on October 5, 1999, in Haiti and immigrated to the United States at age four, originally settling with his family in Florida before moving to Everett, Massachusetts. He initially attended Everett High School. As a junior, he was named the Massachusetts Defensive Player of the Year by USA Today after recording 65 tackles, two sacks, two interceptions, two fumble recoveries, and a blocked kick as Everett won a second straight MIAA state championship. After the retirement of Everett's coach at the end of the season, Cine moved to Cedar Hill, Texas, to live with an uncle and enrolled at Trinity Christian School for his senior year. While at Cedar Hill, he was coached by Hall of Fame cornerback Deion Sanders. Cine committed to play college football at Georgia over offers from Texas, Michigan, Penn State, and Florida.

College career
Cine played in all 14 of Georgia's games during his freshman season and started the final two. He was named a starting safety for the Bulldogs going into his sophomore season. Cine finished the season with 49 tackles and 12 passes broken up over ten starts and was ejected from the team's game against Florida after drawing a targeting penalty. On January 15, 2022, Cine declared for the 2022 NFL Draft. Cine was selected by the Minnesota Vikings as the last pick in the first round of the draft.

Professional career

Minnesota Vikings
Cine was selected with the 32nd overall pick by the Minnesota Vikings in the 2022 NFL Draft. In Week 4 against the New Orleans Saints, Cine suffered a compound fracture injury to his lower left leg during a punt coverage play, which required two surgeries, ending his rookie season.

References

External links
 Minnesota Vikings bio
Georgia Bulldogs bio

1999 births
Living people
People from Cedar Hill, Texas
Georgia Bulldogs football players
Players of American football from Massachusetts
Players of American football from Texas
Sportspeople from Everett, Massachusetts
Sportspeople from the Dallas–Fort Worth metroplex
American football safeties
Haitian emigrants to the United States
Haitian players of American football
All-American college football players
Minnesota Vikings players